Andy Roddick was the defending champion, but lost in the quarterfinals.

Robby Ginepri won the title, defeating Taylor Dent, who retired from the final due to heat exhaustion with Ginepri leading 4–6, 6–0, 3–0.

Seeds

Draw

Finals

Top half

Section 1

Section 2

Section 3

Section 4

References

 Main draw
 Qualifying draw

Singles